Lena Tracy Hanks (1879–1944), sometimes credited as Lenda Tracy Hanks,  was an American algologist and botanist who specialized in studying North American algae and flora.  She is credited with the discovery of Geranium laxum. She worked at the museum of the New York Botanical Garden with John Kunkel Small.

Works

References

1879 births
1944 deaths
Women botanists
American women scientists